So Proudly We Hail! is a 1943 American war film directed and produced by Mark Sandrich and starring Claudette Colbert, Paulette Goddard – who was nominated for an Academy Award for Best Supporting Actress for her performance – and Veronica Lake.  Also featuring George Reeves, it was produced and released by Paramount Pictures.

The film follows a group of military nurses sent to the Philippines during the early days of World War II. The movie was based on a book written by Lieutenant Colonel Juanita Hipps, a World War II nurse – one of the "Angels of Bataan" – who served in Bataan and Corregidor during the time when MacArthur withdrew to Australia which ultimately led to the surrender of US and Philippine troops to Japanese forces. Those prisoners of war were subjected to the Bataan Death March. The film was also based, in part, on Hipps's memoir I Served on Bataan.

Plot
The film begins with a group of several nurses arriving in Australia, having been some of the few evacuated before the Japanese captured their base.  One of them is Janet "Davey" Davidson, who wanted to stay and fainted at the start of the evacuation and remains in a coma.  An officer asks the other nurses to describe their journey up to that point, beginning a flashback.

The flashback begins in California, as the girls prepare to set off for the Philippines.  Joan, another nurse, is revealed to have two fiancés because she can't say no to a man.  Davey covers for her by stopping the two from figuring out her relationship, and the nurses quickly get on the boat.  The war begins as they go to Hawaii, and the boat is rerouted to the Philippines.  One of the boats in the convoy is also sunk, with survivors being taken aboard the nurse's boat.  One is Olivia, who is very rude and uncaring towards her fellow nurses.  On the boat Davey meets John Summers, a soldier who she initially dislikes.  They come to like one another over time.  Joan meets a man called Kansas, a marine who initially seems nervous.  The ship has a party to celebrate Christmas, where Joan and Kansas dance as well as Davey and John.  After a fight, Olivia reveals she was supposed to get married that day.  However, her husband was killed in an the Attack on Pearl Harbor.  Since then, she has sworn to kill as many Japanese as possible.

Eventually, the ship arrives in the Philippines.  Manila has been declared an open city, so it goes to Bataan instead.  The nurses do their best to heal their patients, but supplies run low there.  Joan takes a liking to the Filipino children in the base, while Janet does the best of anyone.  Olivia initially takes up the job of taking care of wounded Japanese POWs, but she can't bring herself to kill even one.  At the base John and Davey reunite and kiss.  However, the base eventually has to be evacuated as the Japanese advance.  Olivia sacrifices herself to ensure the other nurses escape by suicide bombing the approaching enemies with a grenade.

The troops move onto a jungle "hospital", which is practically untamed but near a town.  Supplies continue to run low here, although everyone does their best.  Ma, the leader of the nurses, has to have her son's legs amputated which puts her through grief and puts stress on the entire unit.  Kansas and Joan also reunite, with Kansas having fought and now leading a regiment of Filipinos.  Janet and John also reunite again.  Eventually, a bombing raid destroys much of the base and kills several nurses and doctors.  The Japanese show no respect for international law, bombing clearly marked hospitals and ambulances.  After John reveals the base's supply convoy has been destroyed and reinforcements are not on their way, the nurses evacuate to a fortress island along with most others.  Joan notably has to knock Kansas out with a rock as he refuses to surrender and wants to fight to the death.
On the island everything starts going well, but soon takes a turn for the worse.  Bombing becomes more common, and it becomes more and more apparent even this "Gibraltar of the East" is going to fall. 

John and Davey decide to get married, despite this being against military law. The base chaplain conducts a makeshift ceremony, and the two are married.  Not long after, John and several other soldiers set out to Mindanao to try to secure supplies.  Before he can return, the base financial department starts burning money and the nurses are told they're being secretly evacuated first.  Initially hesitant, most agree to go.  Joan gives many of her belongings away to her patients, and tells Kansas not to die.  He says he never dies, which isn't reassuring as every time he's said something never happens to him it does soon afterward.  Davey refuses to leave, saying she promised John she would be here when he returns.  Ma tells her John's expedition is considered lost, but only the officers were informed.  Upon learning John is probably dead, Janet faints.  The nurses evacuate, and not long afterward the Japanese take the island.

The flashback ends, with the officer saying he knows how to wake Davey up.  He goes to her, and reads a heartfelt letter from John.  John informs her he is still alive, still fighting, and still loves her.  Davey wakes up and simply says, "John" and the movie ends.
The movie was very timely, released just 13 months after the end of the Battle of the Philippines, with focus on allied efforts at Bataan and Corregidor as well as MacArthur's dramatic escape from the Philippines. Although the love-story plot line is the primary thrust of the film, the difficulties and emotional toll of war are also shown.

Cast

 George Reeves as Lt. John Summers
 Cora Witherspoon as Mrs. Burns-Norvell
 Barbara Britton as Lt. Rosemary Larson
 Walter Abel as Chaplain
 Sonny Tufts as Kansas
 Mary Servoss as Capt. "Ma" McGregor
 Ted Hecht as Dr. Jose Bardia
 John Litel as Dr. Harrison
 Dr. Hugh Ho Chang as Ling Chee
 Mary Treen as Lt. Sadie Schwartz
 Kitty Kelly as Lt. Ethel Armstrong
 Helen Lynd as Lt. Elsie Bollenbacher
 Lorna Gray as Lt. Tony Dacolli

Production
The film originally was titled Hands of Mercy. It was announced in July 1942 with Allan Scott to write the script and director Mark Sandrich.

In August 1942, the title was changed to So Proudly We Hail. The same month Claudette Colbert was announced for the lead.

Cry Havoc, a play about nurses on the Bataan peninsula, had been much criticized for its inaccuracies so Paramount took extra care with the film to get approval from the War Department and military and nursing advisers.

MacDonald Carey and Joel McCrea reportedly were meant to star at one stage. Paulette Goddard reportedly had the script rewritten so her role was as prominent as Colbert's. George Reeves was borrowed from producer Harry Sherman. Sonny Tufts made his debut in the movie.

Reception
Diabolique magazine wrote that "Lake's breakdown scene shows her limitations but overall it's a splendidly effective performance, with a spectacular on-screen death – she should have played more death scenes in her career, she had a very good track record in that department."

Accolades
The film is recognized by American Film Institute in these lists:
 2006: AFI's 100 Years...100 Cheers – Nominated

Adaptations 
So Proudly We Hail was adapted for the Lux Radio Theatre on November 1, 1943 with Colbert, Goddard and Lake reprising their original roles.

Awards
The film was nominated for four Academy Awards:

 Best Supporting Actress (Paulette Goddard)
 Best Cinematography
 Best Visual Effects (Farciot Edouart, Gordon Jennings, George Dutton)
 Best Original Screenplay

References

External links

 
 
 
 
 

1943 films
1943 war films
American war films
American black-and-white films
1940s English-language films
Films about nurses
Films scored by Miklós Rózsa
Films directed by Mark Sandrich
Films set in the Philippines
Pacific War films
Paramount Pictures films
World War II films made in wartime